The New Taipei Bridge is a bridge in Sanchong District, New Taipei, Taiwan. It spans over Erchong Floodway.

Technical specifications
The highest point of the bridge stands at 135.75 meters (around the height of a 40-storey highrise building).

Transportation
The bridge is accessible north from Sanchong Station and west from Xianse Temple Station of Taipei Metro.

Gallery

See also
 Transportation in Taiwan

References

2010 establishments in Taiwan
Bridges completed in 2010
Bridges in New Taipei
Cable-stayed bridges in Taiwan